Frank Castle may refer to:

 Frank Castle, the Punisher
 Frank Castle (rugby league), English sprint athlete, rugby union, and rugby league footballer

See also
 Castle Frank
 Castle Frank (TTC)